Pianalto is an Italian surname.  Notable people with the surname include:

 Sandra Pianalto (born 1954), Italian-born American economist
 Zack Pianalto (born 1989), American football player
 Robert Pianalto (born 1937 deceased 2020) Lieutenant colonel USAF

Italian-language surnames